The first seeds Pat Hughes and Fred Perry defeated Adrian Quist and Don Turnbull 6–8, 6–3, 6–4, 3–6, 6–3 in the final, to win the men's doubles tennis title at the 1934 Australian Championships.

Twenty five teams have entered for the event in which number of pairs was limited to sixteen. Twelve pairs were placed in the main draw and thirteen had to play in the preliminary rounds. Four semifinalists qualified into the first round of the competition proper.

Seeds

  Pat Hughes /  Fred Perry (champions)
  Jack Crawford /  Harry Hopman (semifinals)
  Adrian Quist /  Don Turnbull (final)
  Vivian McGrath /  Gar Moon (semifinals)

Draw

Draw

References

External links
  Source for seedings
  Source for the draw

1934 in Australian tennis
Men's Doubles